The Jersey City Flowage is an artificial lake on the Tomahawk River, located about one mile above the confluence with the Wisconsin River in Tomahawk, Wisconsin.  The dam and the flow are controlled by the Wisconsin Valley Improvement Company.  The dam was originally built in 1910 to provide power for a tannery.Jersey City Flowage is a 423 acre lake located in Lincoln County. It has a maximum depth of 20 feet.

References

External links

Landforms of Lincoln County, Wisconsin
Reservoirs in Wisconsin